Marty Blum is the former mayor of Santa Barbara, California, a city of 92,000. She was born in Illinois and attended Purdue University, later receiving a JD at Loyola University. Blum moved to Santa Barbara in 1968 with her husband Joe, a physician. Prior to her political career, she practiced law on the South Coast.

Blum was elected to the Santa Barbara City Council in November 1995 and won re-election in 1999. Blum was elected mayor in November 2001, and re-elected in November 2005. Her term runs through 2010. She previously served as President of the Santa Barbara Teachers Association. She serves on the Steering Committee of Fighting Back, and sits on the boards of Sarah House, the Homeless Day Center, and Partners in Education.

She is now a member of the Board of Trustees of Santa Barbara City College.

Additional Involvement 

Represents City of Santa Barbara:
Council/County Parks and Recreation Task Group
Santa Barbara County Association of Governments - Alternate

National and State Policy Organizations:  
U.S. Conference of Mayors, Arts, Sports and Entertainment Committee U.S. Conference of Mayors, Environment Committee
League of California Cities, Transportation, Communications, and Public Works Committee
Mayors Against Illegal Guns Coalition, an organization formed in 2006 and co-chaired by New York City mayor Michael Bloomberg and Boston mayor Thomas Menino.

See also
List of mayors of Santa Barbara, California

References

External links

Marty Blum Campaign Website

Mayors of Santa Barbara, California
California city council members
Living people
People from Illinois
Purdue University alumni
Loyola University Chicago alumni
California lawyers
American women lawyers
Year of birth missing (living people)
Women mayors of places in California